Consequence of Power is a 2010 release by Circle II Circle. It was the band's fifth studio release.

Track listing 
All songs written by Zachary Stevens and Paul Michael Stewart
 "Whispers In Vain" - 05:24
 "Consequence Of Power" - 04:23
 "Out Of Nowhere" - 04:09
 "Remember" - 05:28
 Symptoms of Fate - 4:19 (Limited edition bonus track)
 "Mirage" - 05:04
 "Episodes Of Mania" - 05:07
 "Redemption" - 05:29
 "Take Back Yesterday" - 05:01
 "Anathema" - 05:14
 "Blood Of An Angel" - 05:07

Personnel 
 Zachary Stevens – lead vocals
 Andrew Lee — guitars
 Paul Michael Stewart — bass, backing vocals, keyboards
 John Osborn – drums

References

External links 
 Official Circle II Circle website
 Circle II Circle on MySpace
 Consequence of Power on Encyclopaedia Metallum

2010 albums
Circle II Circle albums
AFM Records albums